Karunakaran may refer to:

 K. Karunakaran (1918–2010), Indian politician and member of the Indian National Congress (INC)
Dr. T. Karunakaran (1946-2019), Indian academic, social reformer, rural developer, founder of AGRINDUS
 Karunakaran (actor), Tamil film actor
 A. Karunakaran (born 1971), Telugu film director
 C. N. Karunakaran (1940–2013), Indian painter, illustrator and art director
 C. O. Karunakaran (1892–1970), bacteriologist and microbiologist
 G. Karunakaran (born 1963), Sri Lankan Tamil politician
 P. Karunakaran (born 1945), Indian communist politician
 Karunakaran (Malayalam writer), Malayalam writer

Tamil masculine given names